At the 1950 British Empire Games, the athletics events were held at Eden Park in Auckland, New Zealand in February 1950. A total of 28 athletics events were contested at the Games, 20 by men and 8 by women. A total of seventeen Games records were set or improved over the competition.

A number of events can be viewed in series of thirteen 1950 Empire Games archive reels which have been uploaded by Archives New Zealand on YouTube.

Medal summary

Men

Women

Medal table

Participating nations

 (46)
 (25)
 (6)
 (27)
 (4)
 (2)
 (64)
 (4)
 (7)
 (7)
 (2)
 (1)

References

Results
Commonwealth Games Medallists - Men. GBR Athletics. Retrieved on 2010-08-31.
Commonwealth Games Medallists - Women. GBR Athletics. Retrieved on 2010-08-31.

1950 British Empire Games events
1950
British Empire Games
1950 British Empire Games